Jannum is a small village in Noardeast-Fryslân municipality in the province of Friesland, the Netherlands. It had a population of around 63 in January 2017. Before 2019, the village was part of the Ferwerderadiel municipality.

The village was first mentioned in 1506 as Jawnum. The etymology is unclear.  The Dutch Reformed Church is from the 14th century and has 13th century elements. In 1840, Jannum was home to 97 people.

Gallery

References

External links

Noardeast-Fryslân
Populated places in Friesland